"Happy Happy" is a song recorded by South Korean girl group Twice. It is the group's fourth Japanese maxi single, featuring three other tracks. The song was pre-released digitally on June 12, 2019, and the CD single was later released on July 17 by Warner Music Japan.

Background and release
On April 6, 2019, Twice announced the release of their fourth Japanese single titled "Happy Happy", along with the news that Twice would appear in a television commercial for non-carbonated beverage from the Coca-Cola Company, Qoo on its 20th anniversary of the brand. The commercial, featuring "Happy Happy", began airing nationwide in Japan on April 8. On June 12, it was pre-released as a digital single on various online music portals and the full music video was also released online on the same day. A special limited time collaboration "Qoo & Twice Halloween" featuring Twice member in halloween costume began airing nationwide in Japan on September 9.

The CD single was officially released on July 17, 2019. "Happy Happy Dance Making Video in Hawaii" also released on same day of the single released. To commemorate the release of group's new singles, new AbemaTV original variety show would be aired on July 19. Twice members would fulfill requests from fans which has been recruited in advance, on SNS at all Hawaii locations.  Collaboration project by Twice and Watabe Wedding also released in mid-August on the special site of Watabe Wedding, featuring Twice's surprise appearance at the wedding held at the US-Hawaii chapel "Ko Olina Chapel Aqua Marina".

Composition
"Happy Happy" was composed by Collapsedone, Val Del Prete, Eric Sanicola with lyrics written by Yu Shimoji. It was described as a bouncy dance track similar to many of Twice's past songs, with its euphoric choral repetition of the titular phrase and a clapping beat guiding much of the melody and that it is "meant to represent the brightness of a summer day".

Music video
An accompanying music video for the song was directed by Naive Creative Production and was released on June 11, 2019, on YouTube. The music videos begins with the a split-colored set to emphasize the brighter tones of Twice. It features Twice dressed in colorful, sporty looks and backed by bright graphics as the members are seen playing around during summer days.

Promotion
"Happy Happy" was first performed on Music Station 2 Hour Special episode on July 5, 2019. The single was also performed during Twice World Tour 2019–2020 "Twicelights"'s Japanese leg, which began on October 23, 2019, in Sapporo. On September 28, it was performed on NHK Shibuya Note Presents Twice Request Live, a spin-off project of the music program Shibuya Note. Twice performed live based on requests from fans with location project called "Aim for the Eye! Twice #Gourmet Trip!" at NHK Hall, the first venue in the history of this project.

Commercial performance
The CD single debuted at number 2 on the daily ranking of Oricon Singles Chart with 114,905 units sold on its release day. It also ranked number 2 on the weekly Oricon Singles Chart with 247,032 copies sold, debuted at number 19 with 5,653 downloads on Oricon Digital Singles Chart. It also debuted at number 2 on the Billboard Japan recorded 302,963 unit sales on July 15–21, 2019.

Track listing

Charts

Weekly charts

Year-end charts

Certifications

References

2019 singles
2019 songs
J-pop songs
Japanese-language songs
Korean-language songs
Twice (group) songs
Songs written by Eric Sanicola